Finn Einar Hodt (16 June 1919 – 9 April 2016) was a Norwegian speed skater who competed in the 1950s, and later was a speed skating coach.

Career
Hodt was born in Drammen and represented the club Drammens SK. He placed 13th in the 500 metres at the 1956 Winter Olympics in Cortina d'Ampezzo. He also won bronze medals at the Norwegian Allround Championship in 1953, 1954 and 1957, and placed first at his favorite distance 500 metres in 1940, 1951, 1953, 1954 and 1957.

Hodt was nominated by the Norwegian Skating Union as a member of the team for the 1952 Winter Olympics in Oslo, but his selection was rejected by the Norwegian Olympic Committee due to his collaboration during the German occupation of Norway in World War II. Along with fellow speed skater Hans Engnestangen, Hodt had been one of the few leading Norwegian athletes not to follow a nationwide boycott of sports events (the "sports strike") during the occupation. The boycott had been launched by the Norwegian sports leadership in response to attempts from 1940 onwards by the collaborationist Quisling regime at nazification of all sports events in Norway.

He was later coach for the Norwegian Skating Association. He was accredited as a coach for the 1964 Winter Olympics and team manager for the 1980 and 1992 Winter Olympics. He then joined the team of speed skater Johann Olav Koss as his team leader, resigning after Koss' immense success at the 1994 Winter Olympics. In 1992 he was awarded the Golden Token, the highest award within the Norwegian Skating Association. He died in 2016, 96 years old.

References

External links
 

1919 births
2016 deaths
Sportspeople from Drammen
Norwegian collaborators with Nazi Germany
Norwegian male speed skaters
Speed skaters at the 1956 Winter Olympics
Olympic speed skaters of Norway
Norwegian speed skating coaches
Norwegian sports executives and administrators
20th-century Norwegian people